Kirill Aleksandrovich Terentyev (born 1 November 1979) is a former Russian professional football player.

Club career
He played two seasons in the Russian Football National League for FC Dynamo Bryansk and FC Avangard Kursk.

External links
 

1979 births
Footballers from Moscow
Living people
Russian footballers
Association football defenders
FC Mostransgaz Gazoprovod players
FC Dynamo Bryansk players
FC Avangard Kursk players
FC Sportakademklub Moscow players